Kema Jack (born 10 January 1982) is an international footballer for Papua New Guinea. He played in the 2012 OFC Nations Cup.

References

1982 births
Living people
Papua New Guinean footballers
Papua New Guinea international footballers
Hekari United players
2012 OFC Nations Cup players
Association football forwards
Place of birth missing (living people)